Kouji Hirato (Japanese: 平戸 貢児 Hepburn: Hirato Kouji; born 1958) is a Japanese sculptor and a professor at Joshibi University of Art and Design.

Biography 
Hirato was born in Chiba Prefecture. He attended Chiba Prefectural Keikaku-dai High School, and then Tokyo University of the Arts, where he graduated from the sculpture major.

In 1998, he opened HIRATO ATELIER, after working as a part-time lecturer at Chiba Institute of Technology from 1990 to 1998. He taught part-time at Tokyo University of the Arts from 1995 to 2001. In 2001 he became an assistant professor at the Joshibi University of Art and Design and was promoted to full professor in 2008. Since 2010, he's been the professor of Three-dimensional Art Department as well as the Director of Environmental Art Society.

He has completed numerous sculptural works centered on metals.

Major public exhibition / group exhibition 

 1984 - The 15th Japan International Art Exhibition Tokyo Metropolitan Art Museum Kyoto Art Museum
 1991 - LUNAMI SELECTION Lunami Gallery
 1994 - Contemporary Works' 94
 1995-1998 - Contemporary art exchange between Japan and France
 1997 - CHIBA ART FRASH` 97
 2000 - Skill / Takumi's pleasure
 2001 - Nippon Metal Artists' Exhibition
 2002 - SESSION 
 2002 - Four people's sculpture "Japanese fever heat vol -1"
 2004 - Three people's sculpture "Japan's Feverful Vol. 2"
 2005 - METALLIC PARTY

Solo exhibition 

 1983–1986, 1989, 1992 - UNTITLE
 1990 - From INSTALLATION to SCULPTURE
 1993 - LIFE-FORMS
 1994-1998 - SHAPES OF LIFE
 2001 - LIFE`S ORIGIN Metal Art Museum
 2007 - LIFE'S ORIGIN

References

1958 births
People from Chiba Prefecture
Living people
Japanese sculptors